Who Will Comfort Toffle? is the second picture book in the Moomin series by Tove Jansson. It was first published in 1960. It was first translated into English by Kingsley Hart.

Plot
The lonely Toffle leaves his home to look for friends, eventually finding the Miffle and rescuing her from The Groke.

Later versions
An audiobook version of the story was released as an LP album in 1978 by the Swedish acid/psych progg duo of Peter Lundblad and Torbjörn Eklund. An animated film featuring the music from the audiobook was also made by Johan Hagelbäck in 1980, and a children's play followed. In 2006 the main character (Knytt in Swedish) was featured in the indie game series, Knytt. The series consisted of 3 releases and one expansion. The final release, Knytt Underground, was published in 2012.

References

External links
The Moomin Trove
Animated film Vem ska trösta Knyttet?

1960 children's books
Moomin books
Picture books